Pobitora Wildlife Sanctuary is a wildlife sanctuary on the southern bank of the Brahmaputra in Morigaon district in Assam, India. Pobitora Wildlife Sanctuary holds one of the largest Indian rhinoceros populations in Assam.

Biodiversity

Pobitora Wildlife Sanctuary's grassland vegetation consists of at least 15 grass species including Cynodon dactylon, whip grass (Hemarthria compressa), vetiver (Chrysopogon zizanioides), ravennagrass (Saccharum ravennae), Phragmites karka, southern cutgrass (Leersia hexandra) and signalgrass (Brachiaria pseudointerrupta). The grasslands provide habitat and food resource for the Indian rhinoceros, hosting Assam's second largest population.
Other mammals occurring in the sanctuary are golden jackal, wild boar and feral water buffalo. Barking deer, Indian leopard and rhesus macaque live foremost in the hilly parts. It is an Important Bird Area and home for more than 2000 migratory birds and various reptiles.

In Pobitora Wildlife Sanctuary, there are now around 102 (2018) rhinos, a 10% increase over the last six years.
Pobitora has exceeded its rhino-bearing capacity and is overpopulated. The animals have begun moving outside the sanctuary in search of food, and chances of serious man-animal conflict are quite rife. Besides, the straying animals carry the risk of contracting diseases that afflict domestic animals. Under the Indian Rhino Vision 2020 (IRV 2020) which is a joint programme  of the Department of Environment & Forests, Government of Assam, WWF-India, the International Rhino Foundation and the US fish & wildlife service, six rhinos were translocated from Pobitora and re-introduced into the Manas National Park between December 2010 and January 2011. Earlier, under the same programme, two rhinos were similarly translocated from Pobitora to Manas National Park in 2008.

Pobitora Wildlife Sanctuary is also home to over 375 species of birds.

See also 

 Kaziranga National Park
 List of protected areas in India
 Manas National Park
 Orang National Park
 Wildlife sanctuaries of India

References

External links

 Photo essay on the rhino translocations from Pobitora to Manas National Park

Brahmaputra Valley semi-evergreen forests
Tourism in Northeast India
Wildlife sanctuaries in Assam
Morigaon district
Protected areas established in 1987
1987 establishments in Assam